Krónan is a discount supermarket chain  in Iceland. Krónan has been operating since 2000, and is a subsidiary of the holding company Festi.

There are a total of 26 Krónan stores in Iceland.

References

See also
List of supermarket chains in Iceland

Icelandic brands
Discount stores